Couriel is a surname. Notable people with the surname include:
 Alberto Couriel (born 1935), Uruguayan public accountant and politician
 John D. Couriel (born 1978), American judge

See also
 Curiel